James Michael Reaves (born September 14, 1950) is an American writer, known for his contributions as scriptwriter and story editor to a number of 1980s and 1990s animated television series, including Disney's Gargoyles and Batman: The Animated Series. He has also written media tie-in novels, children's books, and original fiction. He often collaborates with Steve Perry and won a 1993  Emmy Award for Outstanding Writing in an Animated Program in his work on Batman: The Animated Series.

Reaves has Parkinson's disease, and for a time maintained a blog concerning his experiences dealing with the disease and its effects. Typing is now difficult for him, and by his own account, he has lost the ability to speak coherently.  Reaves worked extensively with co-authors between 2004 and 2015, including his daughter Mallory Reaves.

Books

Novels

Anthologies and collections
Darkworld Detective (1981)
The Night People (2005)

Co-Editor
Shadows Over Baker Street (2003) (co-editor and contributor)

Short stories
The Breath of Dragons (1973)
Passion Play (1974)
The Century Feeling (November 1974)
The Sound of Something Dying (1976)
Amber Day (1977)
Love Among the Symbionts (1977)
The Big Spell and The Maltese Vulcan (1977)
Shadetree (1978)
Werewind (1981)
The Tearing Of Graymare House (1983)
The Night People (1985)
The Way Home (with Steve Perry) (1991)
Catspaw (1992)
Elvis Meets Godzilla (1994)
Red Clay (2001) (in The Children of Cthulhu)
House Of The Vampire (2003)
The Adventure Of The Arab's Manuscript (2003) (in Shadows Over Baker Street)
Keep Coming Back (2003)
The Legend Of The Midnight Cruiser (2003)
Undeadsville (2004)
Spider Dream (2005) (in Lost on the Darkside)

Screenwriting

Animated television
Series head writer credits are denoted in bold
The New Archie and Sabrina Hour (1977)
Space Sentinels (1977)
Web Woman (1978)
The New Shmoo (1979)
Blackstar (1981)
The Smurfs (1981)
He-Man and the Masters of the Universe (1983)
The Biskitts (1983)
Pole Position (1984)
Mighty Orbots (1984)
Dungeons and Dragons (1984-1985)
Challenge of the GoBots (1985)
Star Wars: Droids (1985)
Ewoks (1986)
Potato Head Kids (1986)
Teen Wolf (1986)
The Centurions (1986)
The Transformers (1986)
My Little Pony (1986-1987)
The Real Ghostbusters (1986-1987, 1990)
Bionic Six (1987)
Jem (1987)
Spiral Zone (1987)
Starcom: The U.S. Space Force (1987)
Superman (1988)
Teenage Mutant Ninja Turtles (1988-1990)
The New Adventures of He-Man (1990)
Tiny Toon Adventures (1990)
Fox's Peter Pan and the Pirates (1990-1991)

Batman: The Animated Series (1992-1995)
Bobby's World (1992)
Conan and the Young Warriors (1994)
Phantom 2040 (1994-1995)
Gargoyles (1994-1996)
Beast Machines: Transformers (1999-2000)
Spider-Man Unlimited (1999-2001)
Godzilla: The Series (2000)
Max Steel (2000)
He-Man and the Masters of the Universe (2002-2003)

Live-action television
The Secrets of Isis - one episode (1975)
Shazam! - one episode (1976)
Benji, Zax & the Alien Prince - one episode (1983)
The Twilight Zone - two episodes produced, and two stories (1986–89)
Star Trek: The Next Generation - one episode (1987)
Captain Power and the Soldiers of the Future - two episodes produced, three episodes, and one story (1987–1988)
Monsters - four episodes (1988–1990)
Swamp Thing - one episode (1990)
The Flash - one episode (1990)
Father Dowling Mysteries - three episodes (1990–1991)
Young Hercules - one episode (1999)
Sliders - one episode (1999)
Star Trek: New Voyages - one episode (2007)

Film
Batman: Mask of the Phantasm (1993)
Full Eclipse (1993)
Batman: Mystery of the Batwoman (2003)

References

External links

1950 births
20th-century American novelists
21st-century American novelists
20th-century American short story writers
21st-century American short story writers
20th-century American male writers
21st-century American male writers
American fantasy writers
American horror writers
American male novelists
American science fiction writers
American television writers
American male television writers
Living people
American male short story writers
American male screenwriters
Screenwriters from California
People from San Bernardino, California